Amazing Dinoworld is a 2019 two-part streaming mini-docuseries produced by NHK in co-production with CuriosityStream and Autentic. The series lasted two episodes, both covering prehistoric creatures.

Background and production 
CuriosityStream partnered with NHK to develop three series of which Amazing Dinoworld was the first.

Amazing Dinoworld is a paleontology-related series and features digital renderings of dinosaurs. While CuriosityStream drove the storytelling of the series, NHK worked on the series' visual art. Salvatorre Vecchio is the narrator for the series.

In "The Feather Revolution", the first episode of the series, the Deinocheirus and Troodon of the Mesozoic Era are focused on. The second episode deals with the Mosasaurus and an early land-dwelling reptilian ancestor, Protomosasaurus.

Release and streaming 
CuriosityStream developed two episodes for the series, "The Feather Revolution" and "The World of Sea Monsters"; the platform premiered the series on October 17, 2019. The series was also made available on HBO Max at its launch on May 27, 2020.

Episodes

Reception 
In a review of the CuriosityStream platform, PCMag listed Amazing Dinoworld as one of its notable series.

References

2010s American documentary television series
2019 American television series debuts
2019 American television series endings
CuriosityStream original programming
Documentary films about prehistoric life
Documentary television series about dinosaurs
NHK